João Azevedo may refer to:
 João Azevedo (footballer) (1915–1991), Portuguese footballer
 João Azevedo (equestrian) (born 1921), Portuguese equestrian
 João Azevedo (sport shooter) (born 1984), Portuguese sport shooter